Munderi may refer to:
 Munderi (Kannur)
 Munderi (Malappuram)